The 1950 Washington Huskies football team was an American football team that represented the University of Washington during the 1950 college football season. In its third season under head coach Howard Odell, the team compiled an 8–2 record, finished second in the Pacific Coast Conference, and outscored its opponents 265 to 134. Joe Cloidt and Mike Michael were the team captains.

Schedule

NFL Draft selections
One University of Washington Husky was selected in the 1951 NFL Draft, which lasted thirty rounds with 362 selections.

References

External links
 Game program: Washington vs. Washington State at Spokane – November 25, 1950

Washington
Washington Huskies football seasons
Washington Huskies football